George Everett "Tiger" Greene (born February 15, 1962 in Hendersonville, North Carolina) is a former safety in the NFL. He played for the Atlanta Falcons and Green Bay Packers. Now an exceptional golfer.
Tiger was very good at blocking punts. Tiger is now a police officer in Metro Atlanta Georgia.

External links
Just Sports Stats

Living people
American football safeties
Western Carolina Catamounts football players
Atlanta Falcons players
Green Bay Packers players
1962 births
Charlotte Rage players
African-American players of American football
People from Hendersonville, North Carolina
Players of American football from North Carolina
21st-century African-American people
20th-century African-American sportspeople